Heteronomous means 'having different laws' and is used in two contexts:

 Heteronomous annulation, an important character in arthropod evolution;
 Heteronomous language, linguistic dialects.